Maurílio Jorge Quintal de Gouveia (5 August 1932 – 19 March 2019) was a Portuguese Roman Catholic archbishop.

Biography 
Quintal de Gouveia was born in Portugal and was ordained to the priesthood in 1955. He served as titular bishop of Sabiona and was auxiliary bishop of the Roman Catholic Archdiocese of Lisbon, Portugal, from 1973 to 1981. He then served as archbishop of the Roman Catholic Archdiocese of Évora, Portugal from 1981 to 2008.

Notes

1932 births
2019 deaths
Portuguese Roman Catholic archbishops
21st-century Roman Catholic archbishops in Portugal